Oleksandr Skrypnyk (born 31 December 1978) is a Ukrainian diver. He competed in two events at the 2000 Summer Olympics.

References

1978 births
Living people
Ukrainian male divers
Olympic divers of Ukraine
Divers at the 2000 Summer Olympics
Place of birth missing (living people)